Edward Braithwaite (12 December 1902 – 1990) was an English footballer who played in the Football League for Bradford City, Reading and Swindon Town. Born in Salford, he also played for New Cross and Margate.

He joined Bradford City in December 1921 and left them in July 1924. For Bradford City, he made 17 appearances in the Football League; he also made 1 FA Cup appearance.

Sources

References

1902 births
1990 deaths
People from Salford
English footballers
Association football wing halves
Association football inside forwards
Manchester North End F.C. players
Bradford City A.F.C. players
Reading F.C. players
Swindon Town F.C. players
Margate F.C. players
English Football League players